National Route Number 2 (officially, PY02, better known as Ruta Dos) is one of the most important highways in Paraguay, which connects the two major cities in the country, Asunción and Ciudad del Este. Crossing the departments of Central, Cordillera, Caaguazu and Alto Paraná.

Distances and important cities

The following table shows the distances traversed by National Route 2 in each different department, and important cities that it passes by (or near).

2